In developmental biology, choriogenesis is the formation of the chorion, an outer membrane of the placenta that eventually forms chorionic villi that allow the transfer of blood and nutrients from mother to fetus.

Influence on monozygotic twins

Identical twins have identical genomes in the immediate aftermath of twinning.  Two-thirds of monozygotic twins share the same placenta, arising by cleavage before the fourth day of development; the other third have separate placentas because cleavage has taken place after the fourth day after choriogenesis has begun.

Placentas vary with respect to the transport of nutrients and hormones, a variance that may influence epigenesis.  For example, the pattern of X chromosome inactivation is affected by placental status.  There is some evidence that it affects the variance in IQ test findings among identical twins, that is, monochorionic identical twins display less IQ variance one from another than do dichorionic identical twins.  There is weak evidence that monozygotic twins sharing a placenta have a higher concordance rate for schizophrenia than monozygotic twins with separate placentas.  Sharing a placenta increases the risk for infection, and infection in pregnancy has been shown to be a risk factor for schizophrenia.  Equally striking is evidence for increasing difference in genomic expression between identical twins as they are once again implicating environmental intercession.

References

External links

Embryology
Human genetics